Hugh Willoughby (died 1554) was an early English Arctic voyager.

Hugh Willoughby may also refer to:
 Hugh Willoughby, 12th Baron Willoughby of Parham (died 1712), English peer
 Hugh Willoughby, 15th Baron Willoughby of Parham (1714–1765), English nobleman and peer
 Hugh Willoughby (scientist), American atmospheric and hydrospheric scientist
 Hugh L. Willoughby (1856–1939), early designer and builder of seaplanes

See also
 Hugh de Willoughby, English medieval theologian and university chancellor
 Hugh de Willoughby (1135–1205), English knight and nobleman